Director's cut is an alternate edit of a film.

Director's cut may also refer to:

Music
The Director's Cut, a 2001 album by Fantômas
Director's Cut (Helldorado album), 2004
Director's Cut (Kate Bush album), 2011
"Director's Cut", a song by Amaranthe from their 2011 album Amaranthe
Director's Cut (Seventeen album), 2017
The Director's Cut, a 2020 album by Currensy and Harry Fraud

Other uses
Director's Cut (film), a 2016 crowdfunded film starring Penn Jillette
The Director's Cut (radio show), a movie radio show and podcast
"Director's Cut, an episode of Home Movies
 Sonic Adventure DX: Director's Cut